Thomas Hayes may refer to:

Law and politics
 Thomas W. Hayes, California State Treasurer
 Thomas Hayes (Texas politician) in 14th and twenty-first Texas Legislature
 Thomas Hayes (Australian politician) (1890–1967), member in the Victorian Legislative Assembly
 Thomas L. Hayes (1926/7–1987), Vermont Supreme Court Justice
 Thomas Hayes (Lord Mayor) (died 1617), English merchant and Lord Mayor of London
 Thomas Gordon Hayes (1844–1915), politician and lawyer in Maryland

Sportspeople
 Thomas Hayes (boxer) (born 1981), American heavyweight boxer
 Tommy Hayes (rugby union, born 1973), Cook Island rugby union player
 Tommy Hayes (rugby union, born 1980), Irish rugby union player
 Thomas P. Hayes, thoroughbred racehorse trainer who won the Kentucky Derby and the Preakness Stakes

Sailors
 Thomas Hayes (Medal of Honor) (1840–1914), American Civil War sailor and Medal of Honor recipient
 John Brown (sailor) (Thomas Hayes, 1826–1883), American Civil War sailor and Medal of Honor recipient

Others
 Thomas Hayes (San Francisco landowner) (1820–1868), land owner in San Francisco
 Thomas Hayes (bishop) (1847–1904), Anglican bishop
 Thomas Highs (1718–1803), sometimes Hayes, reed-maker and manufacturer of cotton carding and spinning engines
 Thomas Hayes (trader), former UBS trader, convicted in connection with the Libor scandal
 Thomas J. Hayes III (1914–2004), United States Army general
 Thomas Hayes (actor) (born 1997), Norwegian actor

See also
 Tom Hayes (disambiguation)
 Tommy Hays (born 1929), guitarist and vocalist
 Thomas Hay (disambiguation)
 Thomas Heyes, publisher-bookseller